João Paulo da Silva Alves (born 4 June 1990), simply known as João Paulo, is a Brazilian footballer who plays for CRB, on loan from Cruzeiro.

Career statistics

Títulos
Avaí
Campeonato Catarinense: 2019

References

External links

1990 births
Living people
Brazilian footballers
Association football midfielders
Campeonato Brasileiro Série A players
Campeonato Brasileiro Série B players
Campeonato Brasileiro Série C players
Campeonato Brasileiro Série D players
Botafogo Futebol Clube (PB) players
Estanciano Esporte Clube players
Club Sportivo Sergipe players
Associação Atlética Coruripe players
Agremiação Sportiva Arapiraquense players
Tombense Futebol Clube players
Santa Cruz Futebol Clube players
Paraná Clube players
Atlético Clube Goianiense players
Avaí FC players
Associação Atlética Ponte Preta players
Fortaleza Esporte Clube players
Cruzeiro Esporte Clube players
Clube de Regatas Brasil players